In chemistry, a free element is a chemical element that is not combined with or chemically bonded to other elements. Examples of elements which can occur as free elements include the oxygen molecule (O) and carbon. All atoms of free elements have an oxidation number of 0. They hardly ever bond with other atoms. Other examples of free elements include the noble metals gold and platinum.

See also
Native metal
Noble metal
Native element mineral
Gangue
Native state

References

Chemistry